This is a list of the Cape Verde national football team results from 2000 to 2019.

2000s

2000

2001

2002

2003

2004

2005

2006

2007

2008

2009

2010s

2010

2011

2012

2013

2014

2015

2017

2018

2019

Notes

References 

2000s in Cape Verde
2010s in Cape Verde
Cape Verde national football team results